Izumida (written: 泉田, 和泉田, or 出水田) is a Japanese surname. Notable people with the surname include:

, Japanese politician
, Japanese professional wrestler

Fictional characters
, a character in the video game A3!
, a character in the manga series Yowamushi Pedal

Japanese-language surnames